Valjevo (Serbian Cyrillic: Ваљево) is a city and the administrative center of the Kolubara District in western Serbia. According to the 2011 census, the administrative area of Valjevo had 90,312 inhabitants, 59,073 of whom were urban dwellers.

Valjevo occupies an area of 905 square kilometers; its altitude is 185 meters. The city is situated along the river Kolubara, a tributary of the Sava river.

History

In the nearby village of Petnica, scientists found the first complete neolithic habitat in Serbia and dated it at 6,000 years old. In Roman times this area was part of the province of Moesia. Valjevo was mentioned for the first time in 1393. It was an important staging post on the trade route that connected Bosnia to Belgrade. Valjevo became significant during the 16th and 17th centuries under stable Ottoman rule. 

According to Matija Nenadović, there were 24 mosques in Valjevo in the late 18th century.

At the beginning of the 19th century most of the territory of Serbia rapidly transformed. The Serbian revolution began with armed rebellion. In 1804, the local Serb population had rebelled against the Turkish lords and liberated a large part of Serbia. One cause for the revolution was the killing of two prominent Serbian commanders by the Ottoman Turks. The two well-known knights, Ilija Birčanin and Aleksa Nenadović, were killed in Valjevo on the bridge over the Kolubara.

The settlement's development accelerated further in the 20th century, when Valjevo became an important industrial and cultural center. During the First World War the battle of Kolubara was fought in the immediate vicinity. A large hospital for the wounded was in the town. One of the captured partisan leaders Stjepan Filipović was executed by the Nazis in Valjevo in 1942.

In 1999, Valjevo was repeatedly bombed during the NATO attack on Yugoslavia.

Settlements
Apart from the city, Valjevo covers the administrative area which includes the following settlements:

Demographics

According to the 2011 census results, the city of Valjevo has a population of 90,312 inhabitants.

Ethnic groups
The ethnic composition of the city of Valjevo:

Geography

The Valjevo mountain range (Medvednik, Jablanik, Povlen, Maljen, Suvobor), with gently-rolling hills surrounds the town. Divčibare is a plateau in the mountain of Maljen. It has an average altitude of 1000 m. It is 28 km from Valjevo and 110 km from Belgrade.

The canyon of the Gradac River (also the name of a Valjevo suburb) ends in the town centre. The Gradac is one of Europe's cleanest rivers, as evidenced by the presence of Eurasian otters, which only inhabit unpolluted waters. It abounds in brook trout. Also, the artificial lake Rovni is located 15 kilometers from the center of Valjevo.

Amenities
The Valjevo mountain range offers clean air, medicinal herbs, forest fruits and wild game. The vicinity is kept free of industrialisation and the soil is unpolluted, so the food grown there is healthy. Hunting and fishing in the mountain rivers is common. The air-spa of Divčibare offers rest and recreation.

Vrujci Spa has mud baths for rheumatic diseases, as well as a hotel and sports complex with swimming pools.

Old water mills are found in the thirteen square kilometers natural reserve.

In Petnica, 5 km away from Valjevo, the Petnica Science Center supports young researchers. It has outdoor swimming pools with minor sports facilities, as well as lake Pocibrava, a recreational area.

The Nenadović Tower (Кула Ненадовића), originally an armory built by Jakov Nenadović and his son Jevrem in spring 1813, is adjacent to the road to Šabac, at the edge of Kličevac hill. The construction material was stone from an older Vitković tower. Later, the Ottomans turned it into a prison.

Surroundings
The village of Brankovina is situated near Valjevo and is the home of the Nenadović family. The sights of Brankovina are encompassed in a cultural and historical complex, which includes: the Church of Saint Archangel, Archpriest's school, Desanka's school, Old Courtroom, the Sleeping Outbuilding of the Nenadović family, the graves of the Nenadović family and Desanka Maksimović, as well as old “sobrašica” summer houses in the exquisitely beautiful Brankovina church yard.

Several ancient monasteries are located in the area surrounding of Valjevo, including Pustinja, Lelić, and Ćelije. The sites on which the current monasteries stand have been used for religious purposes since the 10th century, although the current church buildings date to between 14th and 17th centuries. Pustinja Monastery is located in the cleft of a remote mountainous valley and contains rare Serbian medieval frescoes. Excavations have shown that the current church was built on the foundations of a much older church. Parts of the foundation and an unidentified tomb, much older than the church itself, were discovered. The church is only accessible by a steep path. However, despite its inaccessibility, the Turks managed to damage the monastery more than once. It was damaged in 1683 during the invasion of Turkish army to Vienna. Pustinja is today an active female monastery.

Climate
The climate in this area has mild differences between highs and lows, with adequate rainfall year-round. The Köppen Climate Classification subtype for this climate is "Cfb" (Marine West Coast Climate).

Society and culture

Cultural institutions
The most important cultural institution is the National Museum founded in 1951, under whose auspices are the Museum of the First and Second Serbian Uprisings and displays in Brankovina. Other institutions include the Institute for Protection of Cultural Monuments, the Historical Archive, the Town Library. The Cultural Centre has a well-equipped stage and an auditorium with 630 seats. The Youth Centre has "Gallery 34" for exhibitions and forums. The Serbian Language and Culture Workshop offers classes in Serbian for foreigners.

Valjevo has two elite art galleries. The Modern Gallery has a permanent display of works of the Academician Ljuba Popović (1953-63 period), a collection of works presented by exhibitors and a concept of representing fantastic painting after the model of the famous "Mediala". The International Art Studio "Radovan Mića Trnavac" exhibits foreign painters of different styles.

The Cultural and Artistic Society "Abrašević" has a renowned choir, along with folk music and drama ensembles. Theatrical performances are given by the private theatre "Mala scena" and the Drama Studio of Valjevo Grammar School.

The Jazz Fest is accompanied by summer literary talks in the Library Yard. Desanka's May Talks discuss literary topics, where the Desanka Maksimović Foundation grants an annual poetry award.

Tešnjar
Tešnjar is one of the oldest paved streets in Valjevo. It is used for films based in the past and is one of the places that makes the beautiful town unique.

Economy
The main economic activity in the second half of the 20th century was the arms manufacturing firm Krušik, which returned to production after the wars. The Valjevo economy is characterized by small, private companies working in metallurgy, food production and textiles. Austrian company Austrotherm GmbH, Italian company Golden Lady and Slovenian company Gorenje have built production facilities in Valjevo. Another domestic company is Valjevska Pivara, founded in 1860.

The following table gives a preview of total number of registered people employed in legal entities per their core activity (as of 2018):

Politics
Seats in the city parliament won in the 2016 local elections:

Gallery

Notable people

 Serbian singer, songwriter, and producer Željko Joksimović grew up in Valjevo.
 Serbian basketball player Miloš Teodosić was born in Valjevo.
 Draginja Babić (1886-1915) was born in Valjevo and worked at Valjevo Hospital during the Balkan Wars and World War I.
 Gorica Gajević (born 1958), a lawyer and politician born in Valjevo.

Nenadović family
This family produced leaders of the First Serbian Uprising, ministers of the first Serbian government, spiritual leaders and travel writers. Some members are: Voivode Aleksa, Archpriest Mateja Nenadović, Voivode Jakov Nenadović, Sima and Jevrem, writer Čika Ljuba Nenadović, and Princess Persida Karađorđević, the mother of King Peter I of Serbia.

International cooperation
Valjevo has official sister cities:

See also
 List of populated places in Serbia
 Tešnjar
 Valjevo Mountains
 Kolubara
 Gradac (river)

References

External links

 
 Valjevska posla news portal 
 U gradu news portal 

 
Municipalities and cities of Šumadija and Western Serbia
Populated places in Kolubara District
Articles containing video clips